Heddy Honigmann (1 October 1951 – 21 May 2022) was a Peruvian-born Dutch film director of fictional and documentary films.

Early life and education 
Honigmann was born on 1 October 1951 in Lima, Peru, to Jewish refugees. Her mother, Sarah Pach Miller, an actress and homemaker, was from Poland; her father, Witold Honigmann Weiss, an artist and illustrator, was from Vienna.

Career 
Most of Honigmann's films were Dutch productions, but were made in a variety of languages. In 2003 the Museum of Modern Art in New York held a retrospective showing of a number of her films, as did the International Documentary Film Festival Munich in 2020. Honigmann won the Outstanding Achievement Award at the 2007 Hot Docs Canadian International Documentary Festival. In November 2011, the Centre Pompidou in Paris held a retrospective showing of all of her films. She toured Europe from 2012 to 2014 performing the art of mime. She graced the stages of many prestigious theaters including the Düsseldorfer Schauspielhaus, Palais Garnier, and Great theater of Epidaurus Greece.

Personal life 
Honigmann spent most of her adult life in the Netherlands, having become a Dutch citizen.
She died in Amsterdam on 21 May 2022 at the age of 70.

Filmography

Documentaries
Ghatak (1990) (short film)
Metaal en melancholie/Metal and Melancholy (1994)
O Amor Natural (1996)
Het ondergrondse orkest/The Underground Orchestra (1998)
2 minuten stilte a.u.b. (1998)
Crazy (1999)
Privé (2000)
Good Husband, Dear Son (2001)
Dame la mano/Give Me Your Hand (2004)
Forever (2006)
El Olvido (2008)
Om de wereld in 50 concerten (International title: Royal orchestra) (2014)
Joke van Leeuwen: Een wereld tussen twee oren (TV) (2017)
Buddy (2018)
100UP (2020)

Fiction
De deur van het huis (1985)
Hersenschimmen/Mind shadows (1988)
Uw mening graag/Your Opinion, Please (1989)
Goodbye/Tot ziens/Au revoir (1995)
De juiste maat (1998) (TV)
Hanna lacht (2000) (short film)

Awards
Golden Calf for Best Long Documentary (2000) for Crazy
Golden Calf for Best Long Documentary (2006) for Forever
 Best International Director at the Documentary Edge Festival (2009) for El El Olvido
  ShortCutz Amsterdam Career Award (2017)

References

External links
Homepage Heddy Honigmann
Interview with Heddy on eRenlai.com

1951 births
2022 deaths
People from Lima
Peruvian Jews
Peruvian people of Polish-Jewish descent
Dutch Jews
Dutch people of Polish-Jewish descent
Dutch documentary filmmakers
Dutch film directors
Dutch women film directors
Peruvian film directors
Peruvian women film directors
Peruvian documentary film directors
Women documentary filmmakers